Bakers Pink is an American alternative rock band from New York, NY; formed in the early 1990s

Originally known as The Front, from Kansas City, MO, the band changed its name when it joined Epic Records. Officially the band name change occurred because the band had changed their sound significantly and wanted to distance itself from its former incarnation, however, according to the front man, Michael Anthony Franano, it was at the behest of the record company.

Bakers Pink was a title of a demo Michael had recorded while cutting basic tracks at Electric Lady Studios (Jimi Hendrix’s studio in New York City). The name stuck and when pressed to come up with a new name, after many suggestions, the band decided on this new moniker. Bakers Pink released one self-titled album in 1993, with Michael Anthony Franano again writing the majority of the songs; Michael co-wrote the song Untouched which appears on Bakers Pink, with David Werner, who penned Cradle of Love a hit for Billy Idol. The album was produced by Mark Dodson, with co-production by Doug Gordon (Tangier), Michael Anthony Franano and Mark Eddinger; the first single, Watercolours, was re-mixed by Ron Saint Germain (Soundgarden). One video, Watercolours, was released to promote the record. The band toured the U.S. opening for Great White in support of the record.

Band members
Michael Anthony Franano – Lead Vocals, Guitar, Principle Songwriter
Mike Greene – Lead/Rhythm Guitars
Randy Jordan – Bass Guitar/Backing Vocals
Shane Miller - Drums

Additional Personnel
Doug Gordan – Guitars/Slide Guitar
Tom Toons, Tova, Wrecia Ford – Backing Vocals
Mark Eddinger – Keyboards (additional)
Bobby Franano – Keyboards
Gary Corbett - Fender Rhodes (electric piano)
Matt Chamberlain - Drums
Brad Hauser - Upright Bass
Producers: Mark Dodson, Doug Gordon, Michael Anthony Franano, Mark Eddinger, 
Engineers: Mark Dodson, Shannon Carr, Danny Wojnar, Guido Toledo

Discography

Albums
Bakers Pink (1993, Epic Records)
Label: Epic – 472227 2
Format: CD, Album
Country: US
Released: February 2, 1993
Genre: Alternative Rock
Recorded at Electric Lady Studios and Hit Factory Studios
In Europe: CBS 466143 1 (LP) and 466143 2 (CD)

Singles
Watercolours (1993, Epic Records)

See also
The Front
Michael Moon
Michael Anthony Franano

References

External links
Bakers Pink on Facebook
YouTube channel
Michael Franano's website
Randy Jordan Tribute website

Alternative rock groups from New York (state)
Epic Records artists
Musical groups established in 1992
Musical groups from Kansas City, Missouri